Eugene Aram is a 1914 British silent drama film directed by Edwin J. Collins and starring Jack Leigh, Mary Manners and John Sargent. It was adapted from the 1832 novel Eugene Aram by Edward Bulwer-Lytton.

Cast
 Jack Leigh - Eugene Aram
 Mary Manners - Madeleine Lester
 John Sargent - Richard Houseman
 Stewart Patterson - Walter Lester
 Wingold Lawrence - Geoffrey Lester
 Antonia Reith - Elinor Lester
 Frank Melrose - Rowland Lester
 Lionel d'Aragon - The Judge
 Henry Foster - Cpl. Bunting
 Harold Saxon-Snell - Mr. Courtland
 Fred Southern - Peter Dealtry

References

External links

1914 films
1910s historical drama films
British historical drama films
British silent feature films
1910s English-language films
Films directed by Edwin J. Collins
Films based on British novels
Films based on works by Edward Bulwer-Lytton
Films set in England
Films set in the 1740s
Films set in the 1750s
Crime films based on actual events
British black-and-white films
1914 drama films
1910s British films
Silent drama films